Northway (K’ehtthiign in Upper Tanana Athabascan) is a census-designated place (CDP) in Southeast Fairbanks Census Area, Alaska, United States.  Prior to the 2020 Census, the borders of the CDP got expanded to include Northway Junction and Northway Village. The population was 234 at the 2020 census, up from 71 in 2010.

Geography
Northway is located at  (62.969297, -141.905034).

The highest sea-level pressure in the United States was recorded at Northway on January 31, 1989 with a reading of 31.85 inches, a record only surpassed by two readings in Siberia. Due to aircraft altimeters only being able to calibrate to 31 inches, most were grounded.

Climate
Northway has a dry-winter continental subarctic climate (Köppen Dwc).

Transportation

There is a shuttle between Tok and Northway three times a week, connecting with the Fairbanks - Glennallen - Anchorage service.

Demographics

Northway first appeared on the 1950 U.S. Census as the unincorporated village of "Northway-Nabesna", which included the native village of Nabesna on the west side of Nabesna River across from present-day Northway Village. It returned as Northway in 1960. In 1980, it was made a census-designated place (CDP).

As of the census of 2010, there were 290 people. The racial makeup of the CDP was 66% Native American, 29% White, and 4.8% from two or more races.

The median age was 39.6.

Education
Northway is part of the Alaska Gateway School District. Walter Northway School, a K-12 campus, serves community students.

References

Tanana Athabaskans
Census-designated places in Alaska
Census-designated places in Southeast Fairbanks Census Area, Alaska
Census-designated places in Unorganized Borough, Alaska